Nishigandha Kunte (निशिगंधा कुंटे) is an Indian actress, event anchor and artist who has hosted several events and appeared in commercial advertisement  as well as movies. Born in Pune, Nishigandha started her formal career as event anchoring since year 2014

Career
Nishigandha started her anchoring carrier in 2014 since then she hosted several commercial and celebrity events.

She made her Bollywood debut in 2015, with a cameo role in Deepika Padukone and Ranveer Singh starrer, Bajirao Mastani (film)

She played sangeeta's character in FuttureXProduction's Figght produced by Lalit Oswaal and directed by Jimmy Moray, the film has been released in 2018

References

External links

 
 
 
 

Female models from Maharashtra
1994 births
Living people